George Kidd (1925 – 5 January 1998) was a Scottish professional wrestler and television broadcaster.

Early life
George Kidd was born in Dundee, Scotland, one of three brothers. He spent his childhood in the Hilltown area and attended Clepington Primary and Stobswell Secondary School. Kidd later left an apprenticeship to join the Royal Navy’s Fleet Air Arm in 1943 and served as a mechanic during World War II.

Professional wrestling career
In 1946, after leaving the army, Kidd started to work as a professional wrestler. Yet he was able to enjoy great success during his career by developing an elaborate, clever, and sometimes whimsical so-called ”British” style of wrestling. Kidd’s first paid match took place in 1946 at the Caird Hall in Dundee, where he was “booked” (professional wrestling term for being hired for one match) by promoter George de Relwsykow. In only a four-year span, he went on to conquer numerous championship titles, making a name for himself internationally.

In May 1947, Kidd defeated Tony Lawrence in the capital city of Edinburgh, and became the Scottish Lightweight champion.

In 1948, Kidd won the British Lightweight Title, defeating Jack Dempsey. He surrendered it to Alan Colbeck in 1949.

In 1949, Kidd added the European Lightweight title to his record competing in Paris.

In 1949, Kidd won a tournament for the Mountevans Rules World Lightweight title. Shortly thereafter, he travelled to Mexico and defeated Rudi Quarez for the NWA World Lightweight title and brought the unified title back to the UK.

In February 1950, Kidd briefly lost his titles to, but regained the next month from, French wrestler René Ben Chemoul, adding Chemoul's FFCP World Lightweight Title to the crown. By 1952 he had also defeated Spanish and Belgian claimants to become undisputed World Lightweight champion (inasmuch as Kidd's was the only active version worldwide of the title). He held onto the combined title for 24 consecutive years, defending it 49 times. His title would remain undisputed until the creation of the UWA World Lightweight Championship in 1975.

Kidd was admired for his ability to counter or escape from the most intricate holds, earning himself the nickname of “the Houdini of the mat”. Kidd was also a devout practitioner of Hatha Yoga, which helped him develop flexibility and mental sharpness instead of focusing only on muscle bulk, which in turn helped him defeat stronger and heavier opponents. Kidd was also a showman who knew how to focus on his in-ring skills instead of gimmicks to entertain a crowd. His technical savvy coupled with a fierce competitive spirit allowed him to out-wrestle some of the most praised names in the professional wrestling business.

In 1976, after more than 1000 matches, suffering only 7 defeats, Kidd resigned his championship and retired. During his lengthy career, Kidd rarely wrestled on television (although he often appeared on it as a broadcaster), because he believed that over-exposure would turn the sport he loved into a pantomime. He also trained or influenced many other accomplished pro wrestlers who would later go on to become major stars on British television’s World of Sport era, including long-lasting lightweight champion Johnny Saint.

In 2015, George Kidd became the first entrant into the Scottish wrestling’s hall of fame created by wrestling historian Bradley Craig. He was inducted by former wrestler turned Aberdeen councillor Len Ironside during Hell for Lycra XII,  a Scottish Wrestling Entertainment event in Caird Hall. A memorial plaque honoring him was also hung in the venue.

In 2017, Wrestlers Reunion Scotland created The George Kidd Scottish Wrestling Hall of Fame) with Drew McIntyre being the inaugural inductee. Subsequent Hall of Fame classes have included Lionheart, Piper Niven and Noam Dar amongst others.

Broadcasting career
Kidd also worked for Grampian Television, which started transmitting in his hometown city of Dundee in 1961. He hosted Wednesday People and The George Kidd Show. In 1965, viewers voted him Grampian Television Personality of the Year.

Personal life
On 8 June 1949, George married his wife Hester MacLachlan in Dundee.

Kidd owned a series of pubs in his hometown, including the Ellenbank Bar in Alexander Street.

In 1965 Kidd he was awarded the Dundee’s ‘’First Citizen’’ title.

George Kidd died on 5 January 1998. He had moved to Lawrence Street in the Broughty Ferry suburb of Dundee. His wife Hester had already died before him. He was survived by a son, George.

Notes

References

1998 deaths
1925 births
Scottish male professional wrestlers
Sportspeople from Dundee
Fleet Air Arm personnel of World War II
Scottish television personalities